Achronix Semiconductor is an American fabless semiconductor company based in Santa Clara, California with an additional R&D facility in Bangalore, India, and an additional sales office in Shenzhen, China. Achronix is a diversified fabless semiconductor company that sells FPGA products, embedded FPGA (eFPGA) products, system-level products and supporting design tools. Achronix was founded in 2004 in Ithaca, New York based on technology licensed from Cornell University. In 2006, Achronix moved its headquarters to Silicon Valley.

Achronix was originally self-funded by several million dollars of founder's capital. Since 2006, Achronix has been funded by a combination of Venture capital funding, private equity funding and debt from traditional lenders. Since Achronix is a private company, the total amount of capital raised to date has not been disclosed, but the total amount of capital raised is thought to be in the $180M-$200M range.  Achronix achieved profitability in 2016 and reportedly achieved sales of over $100M YTD in 2017, making it one of the highest growth semiconductor companies globally.

In July 2021 Achronix cancelled its plans to go public through a merger with a special acquisition (SPAC) company ACE Convergence Acquisition Corp due to regulatory approval difficulties. The proposed transaction valued the company at $2.1bn.

Products 

 Speedster7t FPGAs - Standalone FPGA devices built on TSMC 7 nm FinFET technology. It includes a 2D Network-on-Chip (NoC), GDDR6 memory interfaces, up to 72 transceivers operating at 1-112Gbit/s, 400G Ethernet MACs, PCIe Gen5 controllers and up to 1,760 machine learning processors (MLP) for mathematical operations with variable precision number formats.
 Speedcore eFPGAs - Embedded FPGA IP that is integrated into a SoC or ASIC device. It consists of customer defined amounts of reconfigurable logic blocks, logic and block RAM, DSP blocks and Machine Learning Process (MLP) blocks. Speedcore is supported in TSMC 16FF+, TSMC 7 nm FinFET and TSMC 12FFC is under development.
 VectorPath Accelerator Cards - PCIe card which is based on the Speedster7t FPGA family. This card includes 400G and 200G network interfaces, 8 GDDR6 memories, and additional expansion ports for custom connectivity.
 ACE - FPGA development tools which are used to design for all of Achronix's FPGA and eFPGA devices.

Awards and recognition 
In August 2018, Achronix was recognized by CIOReview Magazine as one of 20 of the 2018 Most Promising High-Performance Compute Solution Providers.

References

External links 
 Intel lets outside chip maker into its fabs. Achronix goes all red, white, and blue // The Register,  1 November 2010
 Exploring the Intel and Achronix Deal // David Kanter, Real World Tech, November 8, 2010
 22-nm-Chips von Intel heben Startup auf FPGA-Thron // Frank Riemenschneider, Elektronik Net, 2012-04-24
 Intel’s First Factory Customer Touts Made-in-USA Chips // The Wall Street Journal, Feb 20, 2013
 Breaking the Balance. Achronix FPGAs Disrupt the Status Quo // Kevin Morris, EEJournal, February 26, 2013
 My Take on Achronix & Its Products, Paul Dillien, All programmable planet, 3/11/2013
 Alexander Bachmutsky, System Design for Telecommunication Gateways, chapter "3.5.2.1 Achronix FPGAs"

See also 

 Altera
 Xilinx

American companies established in 2004
Electronics companies established in 2004
Fabless semiconductor companies
Technology companies based in the San Francisco Bay Area
Manufacturing companies based in San Jose, California
Semiconductor companies of the United States
Reconfigurable computing